Cotation Assistée en Continu (CAC) was an electronic trading system used at the Paris Bourse, the French stock exchange, in the 1980s and 1990s. It was introduced in 1986 for trading less liquid equities, and in 1989 it was operational for all listed stocks. The acronym is also used to refer to the CAC 40, a stock index provided by the Paris Bourse. Curiously, the acronym also fits the name of the early Parisian stockbrokers' association, the "Compagnie des Agents de Change". The CAC system was a version of an earlier system developed by the Toronto Stock Exchange in the mid-1970s: CATS (Computer Assisted Trading System). In the early 1990s, the Paris Bourse developed an upgraded technology known as NSC (Nouveau Système de Cotation), which served as a technological platform for the Euronext initiative. The Paris Bourse became Euronext Paris in 2000.

CAC, like CATS, was an order-driven market platform that handled the process of order matching and price setting through a double auction algorithm. It allowed for a full automation of quotation in a centralised, order-driven exchange.

Stock exchanges in Europe
Former electronic trading platforms
1986 software